General elections were held in Belgium on 29 August 1831. They were the first elections to the new bicameral parliament created by the constitution adopted in February 1831.

In the Senate elections Catholics won 31 seats and Liberals four. Voter turnout was 62.2%, although only 46,000 people (1.1% of the country's population) were eligible to vote.

On 8 September 1831, King Leopold I of Belgium opened the 1831–1832 parliamentary session, the first ever of the Belgian Parliament.

Electoral system
The electoral system was defined in the 1831 constitution and the electoral law of 3 March 1831. The 102 members of the Chamber of Representatives and 51 members of the Senate were elected by absolute majority in 44 electoral districts. Each district had between one and seven representatives and one to three senators; some were elected by joint or alternating districts.

Eligibility vote was restricted to men aged 25 or older who held Belgian nationality either through birth or through grand naturalisation, and who paid a cens fixed by the electoral law. The cens differentiated depending on the place of residence.

Constituencies
The 44 constituencies elected 102 representatives and appointed 51 senators as follows.

Results

Senate

References

1830s elections in Belgium
1831 in Belgium
1831 elections in Europe
August 1831 events